The United States Attorney for the Middle District of Florida is the United States Attorney responsible for representing the federal government in the United States District Court for the Middle District of Florida.
The U.S. Attorney for the Middle District of Florida has offices in Fort Myers, Jacksonville, Ocala, Orlando, and Tampa.

Roger B. Handberg is the current acting U.S. Attorney. President Joe Biden nominated Handberg to become the next U.S. Attorney for the Middle District of Florida on September 15, 2022. Handberg previously served as interim U.S. Attorney for the Middle District of Florida and was in charge of the Orlando office.

The previous U.S. Attorney for the Middle District of Florida was Maria Chapa Lopez who was appointed by President Donald Trump. 

Formerly the Deputy United States Attorney for the Middle District of Florida, James Klindt received this position after the resignation of U.S. Attorney Paul Perez in March 2007.   Perez was appointed to the position in March 2002 by President George W. Bush.   Though Perez resigned in the wake of the dismissal of United States Attorneys controversy, he stated that his resignation was not related to the ongoing inquiry surrounding United States Attorney General Alberto Gonzales. 
 
Charles R. Wilson served as United States Attorney for the Middle District of Florida from 1994 until his appointment to the United States Court of Appeals for the Eleventh Circuit in 1999.

References